Joseph Benoit (February 27, 1916 – October 19, 1981) was a National Hockey League right wing.  He played for the Montreal Canadiens during the 1940s.  He missed the 1943–44 season while serving with the Canadian Forces in World War II, and the 1944–45 season playing for the Calgary Army team.

He is chiefly remembered as the man who preceded Maurice Richard on the "Punch Line" at right wing. He scored 20 goals in 1941–42 in a 48-game schedule, and 30 goals in 1942–43 in a 50-game schedule.  Joe decided to sacrifice his career to serve his country in World War II, though and joined the armed forces.

In his NHL career, Benoit played in 185 games.  He recorded 75 goals and 69 assists.  He also appeared in 11 Stanley Cup playoff games, scoring six goals and adding three assists. He won a Stanley Cup Championship in 1946.

Career statistics

International play

External links
 Joe Benoit @ Legends of Hockey
 

1916 births
1981 deaths
Canadian ice hockey right wingers
Canadian Army personnel of World War II
Sportspeople from St. Albert, Alberta
Montreal Canadiens players
Springfield Indians players
Stanley Cup champions
Ice hockey people from Alberta